Dionysios Iliadis (born 22 January 1983) is a Greek judoka (Judo competitor).

External links
 

1983 births
Living people
Greek male judoka
Judoka at the 2004 Summer Olympics
Olympic judoka of Greece
Mediterranean Games bronze medalists for Greece
Mediterranean Games medalists in judo
Competitors at the 2005 Mediterranean Games
21st-century Greek people